Rachiplusia grisea is a species of moth of the family Noctuidae. It is found in South America, including Peru.

References 

Plusiinae
Moths described in 2008
Moths of South America